Robert Troup (1757 – January 14, 1832) was a soldier in the Continental Army during the American Revolutionary War and a United States district judge of the United States District Court for the District of New York. He participated in the Battles of Saratoga and was present at the surrender of British General John Burgoyne.

Education

Born in 1757, in Elizabethtown, Province of New Jersey, British America,

Troup graduated from King's College (now Columbia University) in 1774 and read law, with John Jay. At college, he was the roommate of Alexander Hamilton.

Career

At the start of the American Revolutionary War, Troup joined the Hearts of Oak, a volunteer infantry unit of the New York militia. He entered as a second lieutenant in 1775, serving alongside other King's College students including Hamilton and Nicholas Fish. In May 1776, Troup was a first lieutenant in Colonel John Lasher's regiment. The Hearts of Oak became part of the Continental Army that year, forming the core of the New York Provincial Company of Artillery.

On August 27, 1776, while serving under General Nathaniel Woodhull during the Battle of Long Island, Troup was captured by the British near Brooklyn. He was confined to the prison ship HMS Jersey, and later was transferred to the Provost Prison in New York until his exchange on December 9, 1776.

Troup rejoined the Continental Army in New Jersey, becoming captain of the New York Artillery's 2nd Regiment, and was promoted to major in February 1777.

In August 1777, he became aide-de-camp to General Horatio Gates, and received a commission as lieutenant colonel on October 4, 1777. As aide to Gates, he served in the Battles of Saratoga and the final surrender of General John Burgoyne at Schuylerville, New York on the 17th of October. He was depicted in an 1821 painting by John Trumbull titled Surrender of General Burgoyne.

Troup was secretary of the Board of War starting in February 1778, and secretary of the Board of Treasury from May 29, 1779 to February 8, 1780.

Post war career

Troup completed his study of law under Judge William Paterson, later a Governor of New Jersey. He was in private practice in Albany, New York from 1782 to 1783. He was in private practice in New York City, New York from 1784 to 1796. He was a member of the New York State Assembly in 1786. He was Clerk of Court for the United States District Court for the District of New York from 1789 to 1796.

Troup was nominated by President George Washington on December 9, 1796, to a seat on the United States District Court for the District of New York vacated by Judge John Laurance. He was confirmed by the United States Senate on December 10, 1796, and received his commission the same day. His service terminated on April 4, 1798, due to his resignation.

Following his resignation from the federal bench, Troup resumed private practice in New York City from 1798 to 1804. He was an Agent for Sir William Pulteney's estates in western New York from 1801 to 1832.

Troup served as a trustee of Columbia College from 1811 to 1817, and was a member of the Society of the Cincinnati. Troup was a lifelong personal friend of Alexander Hamilton, with whom he had roomed at King's College and served in the Hearts of Oak militia unit, and he continued to support Hamilton in politics.

Personal life
Troup resided for many years in Geneva, New York, with his wife Jannetje Goelet (1758–1840), a daughter of Peter Goelet and Elizabeth Ratsey. Together, they were the parents of four children:

 Charles Troup, who died unmarried.
 Robert R. Troup (1789–1836), who died unmarried.
 Louisa Troup (1791–1885), who died unmarried.
 Charlotte Troup (1792–1872), who married James Lefferts Brinckerhoff and had two daughters, Charlotte and Maria Louisa.

Troup died on January 14, 1832, in New York City. Troup was originally interred at St. Andrew's Episcopal Church in Manhattan. After the death of his daughter Charlotte in 1872, his body was moved to Green-Wood Cemetery in Brooklyn.

Legacy and honors
Troup was a co-founder in 1785 of the New York Manumission Society, which promoted the gradual abolition of slavery in New York, and protection of the rights of free black people. Despite being a slaveholder himself, Troup presided at the first meeting of the Society. Together with Hamilton, who joined the Society at its second meeting, Troup led an unsuccessful effort to adopt a rule requiring members of the Society to free any slaves that they themselves owned. In the absence of such a resolution, Troup himself waited to manumit his slaves, freeing four between 1802 and 1814.

The town of Troupsburg, New York was named after Troup. The town of Charlotte, north of the city of Rochester, New York was named by Troup in honor of his daughter.

References

Sources
 Bielinski, Stefan (2010). Robert Troup. Exhibition of the New York State Museum.
 

1757 births
1832 deaths
Columbia College (New York) alumni
Judges of the United States District Court for the District of New York
New York (state) militiamen in the American Revolution
United States federal judges appointed by George Washington
18th-century American judges
Burials at Green-Wood Cemetery
Continental Army officers from New Jersey
People from Elizabeth, New Jersey
United States federal judges admitted to the practice of law by reading law
People of colonial New Jersey
Members of the New York Manumission Society